Blindspotting is an American comedy-drama television series, and a spin-off sequel of the 2018 film of the same name. It is created and executive produced by Rafael Casal and Daveed Diggs, writers, producers and lead stars of the original film, and focuses on the supporting character of Ashley, played again by Jasmine Cephas Jones, who also acts as producer. Keith Calder, a producer on the original film, is also an executive producer, with Casal also acting as showrunner. It premiered on June 13, 2021 on Starz. In October 2021, the series was renewed for a second season which is set to premiere on April 14, 2023.

Set six months after the events of the film, the series follows Ashley after Miles, her boyfriend and father of their son, is suddenly incarcerated, forcing her to move in with Miles' mother. It co-stars Jaylen Barron, Candace Nicholas-Lippman, Benjamin Earl Turner, and Atticus Woodward. Casal appears as a guest, reprising his role as Miles.

Plot
Six months after the events in the film of the same name, Miles, Ashley's partner of 12 years and father of their son, is suddenly incarcerated, and the situation leaves her to navigate a chaotic and humorous existential crisis when she and her son Sean are forced to move in with Miles' mother and half-sister.

Cast

Main
 Jasmine Cephas Jones as Ashley Rose
 Jaylen Barron as Trish
 Candace Nicholas-Lippman as Janelle
 Benjamin Earl Turner as Earl
 Atticus Woodward as Sean

Recurring
 Helen Hunt as Rainey
 Rafael Casal as Miles
 Justin Chu Cary as Rob
April Absynth as Jacque
Margo Hall as Nancy
Andrew Chapelle as Scotty
Lil Buck as Buck
Jon Boogz as Boogz
Anthony Ramos as Yorkie
 Lance Cameron Holloway as Cuddie
 Leland Orser as Carl
 LeVar Burton as (season 2)
 Katlynn Simone Smith as (season 2)
 Tamera Tomakili as (season 2)
 Tim Chantarangsu as (season 2)

Guest stars
 Utkarsh Ambudkar as Niles Turner
 Blake Anderson as Date
 E-40 as himself (season 2)
 P-Lo as  himself (season 2)
 Too $hort as  himself (season 2)

Episodes

Series overview

Season 1 (2021)

Season 2

Production

Development
In September 2020, it was announced Starz had ordered a spin-off series based upon Blindspotting by Carlos López Estrada, with Jasmine Cephas Jones set to
star and produce, with Daveed Diggs and Rafael Casal serving as executive producers and writers on the series. Production companies involved with the series were slated to consist of Lionsgate Television, Snoot Entertainment, and Barnyard Projects. In December 2020, Benjamin Earl Turner, Atticus Woodward, Jaylen Barron, Candace Nicholas-Lippman and Helen Hunt joined the cast in starring roles, with Rafael Casal and Justin Chu Cary set to appear in recurring capacity.

Principal photography for the series began in December 2020. Production for the first season took place in March 2021 in West Oakland, Oakland, California.

Diggs does not reprise his film role as Collin in the first season beyond a voice cameo in the finale, despite co-creating the show. Casal hoped to include Collin during the planning stages but Diggs wished for the season to focus on Ashley, though he ultimately came to regret not making an appearance. Diggs and Casal have both expressed interest in bringing back Collin for a potential second season.

On October 14, 2021, Starz renewed the series for a second season. On April 14, 2022, LeVar Burton, Katlynn Simone Smith, Tamera Tomakili, and Tim Chantarangsu were cast in recurring roles while E-40, P-Lo and Too $hort are set to guest star for the second season. Production for the series' sophomore season wrapped on April 28, 2022.

It was announced on January 11, 2023 that STARZ is set to premiere a number of episodes of their sophomore season at the 2023 SXSW Festival held in Austin, Texas in March under the TV Spotlight catergory.

Music 
Blindspotting creators Rafael Casal and Daveed Diggs had recruited fellow schoolmate Ambrose Akinmusire and Blindspotting (film) composer Michael Yezerski to compose the score for the television series. Akinmusire and Yezerski have created score to accompany Spoken Word, Verse, Dance, and various other types of scenes demonstrated throughout the series. In a Variety article between the two musicians, they describe the experience as "a very rare opportunity for the score to just become the driving language of a piece of dramatic television content."

Soundtrack

Release 
The series had its world premiere at the Tribeca Film Festival on June 11, 2021. It premiered on Starz on June 13, 2021. The second season is scheduled to premiere on April 14, 2023.

Reception

Critical response
On Rotten Tomatoes, the series holds an approval rating of 100% based on 25 critic reviews, with an average rating of 7.5/10. The website's critical consensus reads, "The rare adaptation that exceeds its source material, Blindspotting deftly takes on complicated social constructs with comedic flair, crafting a show that's as funny as it is poignant while giving its incredible ensemble—led by the captivating Jasmine Cephas Jones—plenty of room to shine." On Metacritic, it has a weighted average score of 76 out of 100, based on 15 critics, indicating "generally favorable reviews".

Awards and nominations

Notes

References

External links
 
Blindspotting at Starz

2020s American comedy-drama television series
2021 American television series debuts
American sequel television series
English-language television shows
Live action television shows based on films
Starz original programming
Television series by Lionsgate Television
Television shows set in Oakland, California
Works about police brutality